WRK, or wrk, may refer to:

 wrk, the ISO 639-3 code for the Garrwa language, spoken by the Garrwa people of the Northern Territory of Australia
 WRK, the National Rail code for Worksop railway station in Nottinghamshire, UK
 WRK, the NYSE code for WestRock, an American corrugated packaging company

See also

 Work (disambiguation)